Ladegaon village in Washim district, Maharashtra, India.

References

Villages in Washim district